Glamorous may refer to:

 "Glamorous" (Fergie song), a 2006 song by Fergie
 "Glamorous" (Natalia song), a 2007 song by Natalia & En Vogue
 Glamorous (album), a 2005 album by Denise Ho
 Glamorous, a member of the Juice Crew

See also
 Glamour (disambiguation)